St. Joseph County Courthouse may refer to:

Second St. Joseph County Courthouse, South Bend, Indiana
Third St. Joseph County Courthouse, South Bend, Indiana
St. Joseph County Courthouse (Michigan), Centreville, Michigan